Leeming is a village in the Hambleton District of North Yorkshire, England.

Geography
Leeming lies a mile east of the current A1(M) road, south of the larger village of Leeming Bar and north of the small hamlet of Londonderry. Nearby is the RAF base of RAF Leeming.
Before the opening of the  £1 million bypass in October 1961, the A1 passed through the village following the path of Dere Street, parallel and close to the main of the airfield.

History

The name derives from the river-name, which turned settlement-name. The etymology may be linked with British *lemanio "elm-tree", but there are other possibilities. An archaeological survey undertaken on Kelsall Villa (a Roman site near to Leeming Bar) describes it as deriving from the river with Leming meaning bright stream.

In April 2008, the nearby base's remaining Tornado F3 squadron (25 Sqn) was disbanded. The base has been redeveloped as a communications station with the formation of No. 90 Signals Unit, the first elements of which began arriving in 2006. Three flying squadrons remain at the base, No. 100 Squadron RAF, Northumbrian Universities Air Squadron and the Yorkshire Universities Air Squadron.

The village churchyard is the burial place of Flt Lt John Quinton GC DFC, who sacrificed himself to save an air cadet by providing the cadet with the only available parachute after a mid-air collision.

Governance
An electoral ward in the same name exists. This ward stretches south to Carthorpe with a total population of 3,500.

Biogas plant

In July 2016, an £18 million biogas plant was opened at the southern end of the village adjacent to RAF Leeming. The fertiliser is then sold off to local farms.

Local firms such as R & R foods (based at Leeming Bar) and Wensleydale Creamery in Hawes both supply waste product for use in the biogas plant. Wensleydale Creamery, famous for producing Wensleydale cheese, signed a contract in 2019 for the biogas plant to take on the whey by-product from their cheesemaking. This will add an additional  of green gas to the plants' output every year, which is enough to power 800 homes.

References

External links

 History

Villages in North Yorkshire
Hambleton District